Federico 'Fede' Vico Villegas (born 4 July 1994) is a Spanish professional footballer who plays for CD Leganés. Mainly a left winger, he can also play as a left-back.

Club career
Vico was born in Córdoba, Andalusia. Midway through the 2010–11 season, the 16-year-old started training with hometown Córdoba CF's first team, but he made his senior debut with the reserves. On 23 January 2011 he made his first appearance with the main squad, coming on as a substitute for Juanmi Callejón in a 1–1 home draw against Girona FC, for his only match of the Segunda División campaign.

On 3 March 2012, Vico scored in a 2–1 league win at neighbours Xerez CD, and became the youngest Córdoba player to score a goal for the club. Late in the following month, this time as a starter, he netted his second, at home against CD Guadalajara (3–2 victory).

On 13 June 2013, R.S.C. Anderlecht agreed a €1.6 million transfer fee with Córdoba, the highest ever received by the Spaniards, and Vico signed a five-contract with the Belgian side. On 31 January of the following year, he was loaned to fellow Pro League team K.V. Oostende, and scored on his debut in the competition on 15 February to help his team to a 1–1 draw at KV Mechelen.

On 1 September 2014, Vico returned to his former club Córdoba but in a season-long loan deal. He made his debut in the competition on the 21st, playing the last 15 minutes of the 1–3 home loss to Sevilla FC; additionally, he was converted into a left back by manager Miroslav Đukić.

Vico scored a backheel own goal in a 1–2 home defeat against Getafe CF, on 9 March 2015. His team were eventually relegated, as last.

On 1 February 2016, after no additional appearances for Anderlecht, Vico was loaned to Albacete Balompié in his country's second division. On 8 December, the free agent signed with fellow league club CD Lugo until June 2018.

Vico joined CD Leganés on 5 July 2018, on a two-year contract. Four days later, he was loaned to second tier side Granada CF for one year.

On 11 June 2019, after achieving promotion, Granada activated Vico's buyout clause and he signed a permanent two-year deal with the club. On 15 August 2021, he returned to Leganés after agreeing to a two-year contract.

References

External links

1994 births
Living people
Spanish footballers
Footballers from Córdoba, Spain
Association football defenders
Association football wingers
La Liga players
Segunda División players
Tercera División players
Córdoba CF B players
Córdoba CF players
Albacete Balompié players
CD Lugo players
CD Leganés players
Granada CF footballers
Belgian Pro League players
R.S.C. Anderlecht players
K.V. Oostende players
Spain youth international footballers
Spanish expatriate footballers
Expatriate footballers in Belgium
Spanish expatriate sportspeople in Belgium